Aldís Amah Hamilton (born 6 April 1991) is an Icelandic actress. She graduated from the Iceland University of the Arts in 2016 and the same year, she appeared as Desdemona in the Vesturport's performance of Othello in the National Theatre of Iceland. On the Icelandic National Day in 2019, she was named Reykjavík's Lady of the Mountain. In 2020, she appeared in the Netflix's Icelandic original series Katla, directed by Baltasar Kormákur.

In 2021 it was announced that she had been cast as the lead actress of the TV series Black Sands, directed by Baldvin Zophoníasson, where she plays the character of Aníta.

Early life
Aldís was born in Germany to an Icelandic author and journalist Alda Sigmundsdóttir and an American father who were working there as English teachers. She moved with her mother to Iceland at the age of three and grew up in Vesturbær.

Filmography

References

External links

1991 births
Living people
Icelandic actresses